Cherry cola is a soft drink made by mixing cherry-flavored syrup into cola. It is a popular mixture that has been available at old-fashioned soda fountains for years. Several major soda manufacturers market their own version of the beverage, including Coca-Cola Cherry, Pepsi Wild Cherry and Cherry RC.
There are also alcoholic drinks called cherry cola, containing Coca-Cola often with vodka and grenadine.

See also
 Cherry juice
I Want You (Savage Garden song)
 List of brand name soft drinks products
 List of soft drink flavors
 List of soft drink producers
 List of soft drinks by country
Queen Mary (cocktail)
Roy Rogers

References

External links